Joseph Riddick "Rick" Hendrick III (born July 12, 1949), nicknamed "Mr. H", is an American businessman. He is best known as the owner of the NASCAR team Hendrick Motorsports. He is also a co-owner of JR Motorsports and founder of the Hendrick Automotive Group, a network of over 100 car dealerships. 

As of 2021, his team has won 280 NASCAR Cup Series races, making him the winningest team owner in NASCAR.  His team has also won a combined total of 18 NASCAR Championships (14 in the NASCAR Cup Series: seven by Jimmie Johnson, four by Jeff Gordon, and one by (Chase Elliott, Terry Labonte, Kyle Larson) (three in the NASCAR Truck Series: all by Jack Sprague) (one in the NASCAR Xfinity Series with Brian Vickers in 2003). He is one of only three owners in history to win NASCAR Championships in the top three series, joining Richard Childress and Jack Roush. Hendrick was inducted into the NASCAR Hall of Fame class of 2017 and was inducted into the Motorsports Hall of Fame of America on March 17, 2020.

Career
Hendrick began drag racing at age 14 in a self built 1931 Chevrolet. Two years later, at age 16, Hendrick won the Virginia division of the Chrysler-Plymouth Troubleshooting Contest, a two-part test consisting of a written exam and a timed hands-on diagnosis and repair of defects planted on a car.

Afterward, Hendrick opened a small used-car lot with Mike Leith. Leith, an established new-car dealer, was convinced to name Hendrick the general sales manager of the company, at age 23. In 1976, he sold his assets to purchase a franchise in Bennettsville, South Carolina. After doing so, he became the youngest Chevrolet dealer in the United States. Hendrick's influence increased sales to make the once troubled location become the region's most profitable. The success of Bennettsville was a precursor to the Hendrick Automotive Group, which now has over 100 franchises and 10,000 employees across 13 states. Headquartered in Charlotte, North Carolina, his company had a revenue in excess of US$3.5 billion in 2009, after selling 100,000 vehicles and servicing 1.5 million, and is the sixth-largest dealership in the United States. Hendrick is also the chairman of the company.

Hendrick drove in two races during the 1987 and 1988 Winston Cup Series, with finishes of 33rd and 15th, respectively. He also had a single start in both the Busch Series and the Craftsman Truck Series. He also had been a pit crew member for the Flying 11 that Ray Hendrick (no relation) drove in the 1960s. In 1997, Hendrick began the Hendrick Marrow Program, a non-profit works with the Be The Match Foundation to support the National Marrow Donor Program.

Team owner
He then moved to the NASCAR Model Sportsman Series (now Xfinity Series), in which he earned one victory with Dale Earnhardt at Charlotte Motor Speedway. In 1984, he founded All-Star Racing (now Hendrick Motorsports). With Geoff Bodine the driver, his team managed to race in all 30 races to finish ninth in the final standings with three wins and pole positions. Throughout his career as a team owner, Hendrick has won 18 Drivers' championships (14 Cup Series, 1 Xfinity Series, and 3 Camping World Truck Series), 347 race wins (252 Cup Series, 67 Xfinity Series 23 with Hendrick Motorsports and 44 with JR Motorsports, and 26 Truck Series), and 291 pole positions (216 Sprint Cup Series, 53 Xfinity Series, 36 with Hendrick Motorsports, and 17 JR Motorsports, and 22 Truck Series). He is widely considered to be the most successful team owner in NASCAR history. On December 13, 2018, Hendrick announced that when he retires as owner of Hendrick Motorsports, there are plans in the works for Jeff Gordon to replace him.

During the late 1980s, Hendrick owned the Goodwrench IMSA GTP Corvette driven by Sarel Van der Merwe and Doc Bundy. The car was actually built by Lola but resembled later Corvette models and was powered by GM's twin-turbo V-6 engine. The GTP team was based in a tiny shop on Gasoline Alley (formerly Roena Street) in Indianapolis, Indiana and managed by Ken Howes of South Africa. The team experienced mixed successes, setting track records and winning many pole positions but few races. The project was abandoned after only a few seasons.

Early and personal life
Hendrick was born in Warrenton, North Carolina and was raised on his family's farm in South Hill, Virginia, where he attended Park View High School. 

He is the father of the late Ricky Hendrick, a former NASCAR driver, who died in a plane crash in 2004 along with other members of the Hendrick family and Hendrick Motorsports crew members.

His main private jet is a Gulfstream V with the tail number N500RH.

On October 31, 2011, Hendrick and his wife, Linda, were involved in a plane crash in Key West, Florida, when the plane landed long at Key West International Airport. Linda suffered minor injuries while Rick suffered three broken ribs and a fractured clavicle.

Legal issues
In 1997, Hendrick pleaded guilty to mail fraud. In the 1980s, Honda automobiles were in high demand and Honda executives allegedly solicited bribes from dealers for larger product disbursements. Hendrick admitted to giving hundreds of thousands of dollars, BMW automobiles, and houses to American Honda Motor Company executives. Hendrick was sentenced in December 1997 to a $250,000 fine, 12 months' home confinement (instead of prison, due to his leukemia), three years probation, and to have no involvement with Hendrick Automotive Group (which was run by Jim Perkins) or Hendrick Motorsports (run by his brother John) during his year of confinement. In December 2000, Hendrick received a full pardon from President Bill Clinton.

Motorsports career results

NASCAR
(key) (Bold – Pole position awarded by qualifying time. Italics – Pole position earned by points standings or practice time. * – Most laps led.)

Winston Cup Series

Busch Series

SuperTruck Series

ARCA SuperCar Series
(key) (Bold – Pole position awarded by qualifying time. Italics – Pole position earned by points standings or practice time. * – Most laps led.)

See also
Hendrick Motorsports
List of people pardoned by Bill Clinton

References

External links
The Hendrick Marrow Program

Hendrick Motorsports

1949 births
American automobile salespeople
Living people
NASCAR drivers
NASCAR team owners
Businesspeople from Charlotte, North Carolina
North Carolina Republicans
People from Mecklenburg County, Virginia
People from Warrenton, North Carolina
Racing drivers from North Carolina
Recipients of American presidential pardons
ARCA Menards Series drivers
American people convicted of mail and wire fraud
NASCAR Hall of Fame inductees
Hendrick Motorsports drivers